"The Lovercall" is the debut single by Austrian pop rock band The Makemakes. It was released as a digital download in Austria on 15 June 2012. The song peaked to number 6 on the Austrian Singles Chart.

Track listing

Chart performance

Weekly charts

Release history

References

2012 debut singles
2012 songs
The Makemakes songs